Different Times may refer to:

 Different Times (musical), a 1972 musical by Michael Brown
 Different Times: Lou Reed in the '70s
 Different Times (Five O'Clock Heroes album), 2011